Sinthgunt is a figure in Germanic mythology, attested solely in the Old High German 9th- or 10th-century "horse cure" Merseburg Incantation. In the incantation, Sinthgunt is referred to as the sister of the personified sun, Sunna (whose name is alliterative to Sinthgunt), and the two sisters are cited as both producing charms to heal Phol's horse, a figure also otherwise unattested. The two are then followed by Friia and Uolla, also alliterative and stated as sisters.

As Sinthgunt is otherwise unattested, her significance is otherwise unknown, but some scholarly theories exist about her role in Germanic mythology based on proposed etymologies, and the potential significance of her placement within the incantation.

Etymology
The etymology of Sinthgunt is unclear.  Within the original manuscript, Sinthgunt is spelled Sinhtgunt (emphasis added). In the 19th century, Sophus Bugge stuck strictly to this reading, proposing a complex compound based on Germanic *Sin-naχt-gund, i.e. "the night-walking one". As a result of the pairing with Sunna, the personified sun, this etymology has been interpreted as a reference to the moon. However, this reading has yielded problems; the moon in Germanic mythology is considered masculine, exemplified in the personification of the moon in Norse mythology, Máni, a male figure. According to Simek, the historical record lacks evidence for any cult of personified celestial bodies among the ancient Germanic peoples.

Schaffner rejects this etymology, as does Eichner, because the first element Sinht- cannot be based on the presupposed earlier Germanic *sinχt-. Such a Germanic form would have yielded Old High German *sīht by regular sound change. The amended Sinthgunt presupposes a Proto-Germanic compound *Senþa-gunþjō, the first element meaning "raid, (military) campaign", the second one "fight". This interpretation fits nicely with other Old High German female names such as Sindhilt (from *Senþa-χilðijō, with its second element also meaning "fight", cf. Old Norse hilðr, Old English hild). Furthermore, Simek also mentions the interpretation "heavenly body, star".

Placement
The figures Fulla (Uolla) and Frigg (Friia) are attested together in later Old Norse sources (though not as sisters), and theories have been proposed that the Fulla may at one time have been an aspect of Frigg. This notion has resulted in a theory that a similar situation may have existed between the figures of Sinthgunt and Sól, in that the two may have been understood as aspects of one another rather than entirely separate figures. Similarly, Wolfgang Beck analysed her as a subordinate goddess from Sunna's retinue, a kind of "situation goddess", based on her unique appearance in the sources.

Friedrich Kauffmann grouped Sinhtgunt as a valkyrie in the 19th century, because the elements -gund and -hild appear frequently in their names. Stefan Schaffner and Heiner Eichner more recently agreed with him, based on Günter Müller's paper on the valkyries' healing powers. 

Karl Heim rejected Kauffmann and grouped Sinhtgunt with the Idisi of the first Merseburg Incantation, as a specially defined group of Germanic goddesses.

Notes

References

 Bostock, John Knight. King, Charles Kenneth. McLintock, D. R. (1976). A Handbook on Old High German Literature. Oxford University Press. 
 Orchard, Andy (1997). Dictionary of Norse Myth and Legend. Cassell. 
 Simek, Rudolf (2007) translated by Angela Hall. Dictionary of Northern Mythology. D.S. Brewer. 

Germanic goddesses